Jeffrey H. Cohen (born 1962) is an American anthropologist.

Education and early career 

Cohen received his undergraduate degree from Indiana University Bloomington. He went on to earn his PhD at Indiana under the supervision of Richard Wilk. 

Cohen's work is centered ethnographically in Oaxaca. For his dissertation, he explored how an indigenous peasant community responded to globalization.  Since that time much of his work has focused on migration, economic development and identity. 

He received his doctorate in 1994 and is currently a professor at Ohio State University in the department of anthropology and a member of steering committee for the Initiative in Population Research.

Research 
Since the late 1980s, Cohen has worked in Oaxaca's central valleys region, specifically in the community of Santa Ana del Valle. This research is documented in his book, Cooperation and Community, published in 1999 by the University of Texas Press.

In 2004 he published the Culture of Migration, also with the University of Texas Press. This book documents a long-term study of migration in 13 villages, all located in Oaxaca's central valleys. The book argues that a "culture of migration" defines movement and frames migration as one of the many strategic moves Oaxacans participate in to organize their lives. Cohen notes the importance of domestic migration, the rise of international and transnational movers and the role that remittances play in the lives of Oaxaquenos in their home communities.

He has also worked on Dominican migration to the United States where he was part of an interdisciplinary investigation of why Dominicans are traveling to Reading, Pennsylvania. He conducts collaborative and comparative research with Ibrahim Sirkeci on Kurdish and Mexican immigration issues.

In 2007 he began an analysis of the impact of political and civil unrest in Oaxaca on migration patterns and compared Oaxacan and Chiapaneco migration patterns. He also studies food and nutrition among immigrants and the role traditional foods, such as chapulines (grasshoppers) play for Oaxacans.

He is co-editor of Migration Letters, an academic journal, as well as of the journal Remittances Review. He is also a member of the Editorial Advisory Board for the book series Research in Economic Anthropology.

Works

References

External links 
 Profile at Ohio State University
 

1962 births
Living people
American anthropologists
Ohio State University faculty
Mesoamerican anthropologists
Indiana University Bloomington alumni